The Girl at the Reception is a 1940 German drama film directed by Gerhard Lamprecht and starring Magda Schneider, Heinz Engelmann, and Carsta Löck.

The film's sets were designed by the art directors Hermann Asmus and Anton Weber.

Plot
An office worker employed at a publishing house is upset, when her former lover is appointed as the new director.

Cast

References

Bibliography

External links

Films of Nazi Germany
German drama films
1940 drama films
Films directed by Gerhard Lamprecht
UFA GmbH films
German black-and-white films
1940s German films